Ellis Dillahunt (born November 25, 1964) is a former American football defensive back. He played in the National Football League (NFL) for the Cincinnati Bengals in 1988.

References

1964 births
Living people
American football defensive backs
East Carolina Pirates football players
Cincinnati Bengals players
Players of American football from North Carolina
People from Jacksonville, North Carolina